The SLT 50 is a heavy duty tractor unit and tank transporter used by the German Army and Polish Army.

History
To replace the first generation tank transporter then in use, as well as to be able to haul the armoured vehicles then in service (among them the Leopard 1 Main Battle Tank), the German Army asked Faun GmbH to develop a new all-terrain heavy tractor, and in parallel Krupp was asked to develop the tank transport semi-trailer.

The result was the SLT 50-2 tractor and the 52-ton SaAnh semi-trailer. The combination was first tested in 1971. The first production combination was delivered in April 1976. Some 324 were built up to 1979, in one series, by Faun (tractor) and Kässbohrer (trailer, under Krupp license).

To be able to cope with the newest versions of the Leopard 2 MBT, the vehicles were upgraded from 1994 to the standard SLT 50-3. This modernisation program was completed in 2000, and it is expected that the vehicles will be able to operate until 2015.

Operators
  -
  - since 2002 after buying Leopard 2A4 MBTs.
 - 
 -

Specification

SLT 50-2 tractor
8x8 tractor.
length: 8.83  m
width: 3.07 m
height: 3.3 m
weight: 22,800 kg
Engine: Deutz MWM diesel TBD 234 V12. Power: 734 bhp at 2100 rpm.
Transmission: 4-speed ZF W500-10 4PW 200 H2
speed:  65 km/h on road, level ground.
Range: 600 km

52-ton SaAnh (Sattelhänger)
52-ton semi-trailer.
length: 13.1 / 7.8 m   (total / loading platform)
width: 3.15 / 3.15 m   (total / loading platform)
height: n/a
weight: 16,200 kg (unladen)
Max.load: 52,000 kg

References

External links
  Walkaround with pictures on the German website panzer-modell.de

See also
 Scammell Pioneer Semi-trailer
 SLT 56 Franziska

Tank transporters
Military trucks of Germany
Military vehicles introduced in the 1970s
Off-road vehicles